The .22 CHeetah (both C and H are upper-case, referring to Carmichel / Huntington) is a .22 wildcat cartridge developed in the 1970s or 1980s by Jim Carmichel and Fred Huntington.

The .22 CHeetah is essentially a Remington .308 BR, modified to fit the .22 caliber. Two custom gunmakers, Shilen Rifle Company and Wichita Engineering, are now making rifles specifically for the cartridge. The cartridge's 50-grain .22-caliber bullets have a muzzle speed upward of 4,300 ft/s (4,250 according to some), and the cartridge is known for its long-range accuracy and velocity. Its high intensity is notoriously hard on barrels, which require constant cleaning.

References 

Pistol and rifle cartridges
Wildcat cartridges